The Second Carib War (1795–1797) took place on the island of Saint Vincent between 1795 and 1797.  The conflict pitted large numbers of British military forces against a coalition of Black Carib, runaway slaves, and French forces for control of the island.

The First Carib War (1769–1773) was fought over British attempts to extend colonial settlements into Black Carib territories, and resulted in a stalemate and an unsatisfactory peace agreement.  France captured Saint Vincent in 1779 during the American War of Independence, but it was restored to Britain by the Treaty of Paris (1783).

Begun by the Caribs (who harboured long-standing grievances against the British colonial administration, and were supported by French Revolutionary advisors) in March 1795, the Caribs successfully gained control of most of the island except for the immediate area around Kingstown, which repelled direct assault on several occasions after the arrival of British reinforcements.  British efforts to penetrate and control the interior and windward areas of the island were repeatedly frustrated by incompetence, disease, and effective Carib defences, which were eventually supplemented by the arrival of some French troops. A major military expedition by General Ralph Abercromby eventually suppressed the Carib opposition in 1797. The Caribs were deported from Saint Vincent to the island of Roatán off the coast of present-day Honduras, where they became known as the Garifuna people.

References

Sweeney, James L. (2007). "Caribs, Maroons, Jacobins, Brigands, and Sugar Barons: The Last Stand of the Black Caribs on St. Vincent", African Diaspora Archaeology Network, March 2007, retrieved 26 April 2007 http://www.diaspora.uiuc.edu/news0307/news0307-7.pdf

Conflicts in 1795
Conflicts in 1796
Conflicts in 1797
Wars involving Saint Vincent and the Grenadines
Wars involving Great Britain
Garifuna
Slave rebellions in North America
18th century in the Caribbean
Slavery in the British West Indies